The 1911 Mississippi gubernatorial election took place on November 7, 1911, in order to elect the Governor of Mississippi. Incumbent Democrat Edmond Noel was term-limited, and could not run for reelection to a second term.

Democratic primary
The Democratic primary election was scheduled for August 1, 1911. However, on July 17, 1911, the State Democratic Executive Committee declared that Earl L. Brewer was unopposed and was declared the nominee.

Results

General election
In the general election, Democratic candidate Earl L. Brewer, a district attorney and former state senator, easily defeated Socialist candidate Summer W. Rose.

Results

References

1911
gubernatorial
Mississippi
November 1911 events